The enzyme cysteine lyase (EC 4.4.1.10)  catalyzes the chemical reaction

L-cysteine + sulfite  L-cysteate + hydrogen sulfide

This enzyme belongs to the family of lyases, specifically the class of carbon-sulfur lyases.  The systematic name of this enzyme class is L-cysteine hydrogen-sulfide-lyase (adding sulfite; L-cysteate-forming). Other names in common use include cysteine (sulfite) lyase, and L-cysteine hydrogen-sulfide-lyase (adding sulfite).  This enzyme participates in cysteine and taurine metabolism. It employs one cofactor, pyridoxal phosphate.

Evolution
Genes encoding cysteine lyase (CL) originated around 300 million years ago by a tandem gene duplication and neofunctionalization of cystathionine β-lyase (CBS) shortly after the split of mammalian and reptilian lineages. CL genes are found only in Sauropsida where they are involved in a metabolic pathway for sulfur metabolism in the chicken egg.

References

EC 4.4.1
Pyridoxal phosphate enzymes
Enzymes of unknown structure